Russian Hill-Vallejo Street Crest District is a  historic district in Russian Hill, San Francisco, California, that was listed on the National Register of Historic Places on January 22, 1988, for the people, events and architecture. The area is a residential enclave defined by retaining walls and natural bluff.

About 

The area is roughly bound by 1020-1032 Broadway, 1-49 Florence Street, 1728-1742 Jones Street, 1-7 Russian Hill Place, 1629-1715 Taylor Street, and 1000-1085 Vallejo Street, in San Francisco, California, U.S. The listing included 27 contributing buildings, 2 contributing sites, and 5 contributing structures. This historic district had survived the 1906 San Francisco earthquake and fire.

This district has architectural works by Willis Polk, Charles F. Whittlesey, Julia Morgan, Albert Farr, Charles W. McCall, and one of the only surviving works of amateur architect Joseph Worcester. Historic houses in the district include the Atkinson House (1853).

Notable former residents of this neighborhood include Katherine Atkinson, Maynard Dixon, Sara Bard Field, Dorothea Lange, Rose Wilder Lane, Horatio P. Livermore, Willis Polk, Mary Curtis Richardson, Dora Norton Williams, and Joseph Worcester.

Other historic districts in Russian Hill include the Russian Hill–Macondray Lane District and the Russian Hill-Paris Block Architectural District.

See also 
 National Register of Historic Places listings in San Francisco, California

References

External links 
 

National Register of Historic Places in San Francisco
Colonial Revival architecture in California
Mission Revival architecture in California
Geography of San Francisco
History of San Francisco
Houses in San Francisco
Historic districts on the National Register of Historic Places in California
Russian Hill, San Francisco
California Historical Landmarks
Houses on the National Register of Historic Places in San Francisco